HMS Rampisham was one of 93 ships of the  of inshore minesweepers.

Their names were all chosen from villages ending in -ham. The minesweeper was named after Rampisham in Dorset.

She was renamed  in December 1957, and reverted to Rampisham in December 1959.

References
Blackman, R.V.B. ed. Jane's Fighting Ships (1953)

 

Ham-class minesweepers
Royal Navy ship names
1957 ships
Ships built in England
Ships of the Fishery Protection Squadron of the United Kingdom